Hampton Lintorn-Catlin (né Catlin; born 1982) is an American computer programmer, programming language inventor, gay rights advocate, and author, best known as the creator of the Sass and Haml markup languages. Hampton was a Vice President of Engineering at Rent the Runway, and has previously held similar roles at Moovweb, Wordset, and at the Wikimedia Foundation. He is currently Chief Technology Officer at Thriveworks.

Creations

Haml

He created a lightweight markup language called Haml which he intended to be a radically different design for inline page templating systems like eRuby in Ruby. Since its initial release in 2006, Haml has been in constant development and has been ported to over 10 other languages. It's the second most popular templating language for the Ruby on Rails framework and has inspired many other templating languages.

Sass

In 2007, Catlin created a style sheet language to expand on Cascading Style Sheets (CSS), used to describe presentation semantics of web pages. Catlin continued to work on Sass with co-designer Natalie Weizenbaum through 2008. Sass is now bundled as part of Rails.

In 2011, he co-wrote with his husband the book Pragmatic Guide to Sass, published through The Pragmatic Bookshelf.

Wikipedia Mobile
Catlin wrote several applications for iOS and other mobile platforms, including Dictionary!, a popular dictionary application, and a Wikipedia browsing client which was later purchased by the Wikimedia Foundation. He was subsequently hired by Wikimedia and given the role as mobile development lead for the Foundation, launching the official mobile website in June 2009. The backend for the site was developed using Ruby and the Merb framework.

Personal life
Catlin was born in 1982 in Jacksonville, Florida and currently resides in New York with his husband and collaborator, Michael Catlin.

The couple made headlines in late March, 2014, for removing a simple puzzle game they had built together from the Mozilla Marketplace after Brendan Eich was appointed CEO of Mozilla. They called for a boycott of Mozilla, pledging "We will continue our boycott until Brendan Eich is completely removed from any day to day activities at Mozilla...." Eich had previously been the center of controversy surrounding his support for Proposition 8, a ballot initiative that banned marriage equality in California, which was re-ignited by his promotion to CEO. After a large public outcry and several Mozilla Foundation employees publicly calling for him to step down, Eich voluntarily stepped down only a week after taking his new position. When asked if he'd donate again, Eich responded "I don't want to answer hypotheticals." In a follow up blog post, Catlin explained meeting Eich to find middle ground and expressing dismay at the response, calling the outcome a "sad victory".

See also
 List of inventors
 List of LGBT rights activists
 List of Wikipedia people

References

External links
 
 
 

American computer programmers
American male non-fiction writers
American technology writers
1982 births
Living people
Web developers
Free software programmers
Wikimedia Foundation staff members
LGBT people from Florida
People from Jacksonville, Florida
American Wikimedians